Acanthodactylus taghitensis  is a species of lizard in the family Lacertidae. The species is endemic to northwestern Africa.

Geographic range
A. taghitensis is found in Algeria, Mauritania, and Western Sahara.

Habitat
The preferred habitats of A. taghitensis are shrubland and desert.

Reproduction
A. taghitensis is oviparous.

References

Further reading
Crochet PA, Geniez P, Ineich (2003). "A multivariate analysis of the fringe-toed lizards of the Acanthodactylus scutellatus group (Squamata: Lacertidae): systematic and biogeographical implications". Zoological Journal of the Linnean Society 137: 117–155.
Geniez, Philippe; Foucart, Antoine (1995). "Un nouvel acanthodactyle en Algérie: Acanthodactylus taghitensis n. sp. (Reptilia, Sauria, Lacertidae) ". Bulletin du Muséum d'Histoire Naturelle, 4e Série, Section A, Zoologie, Biologie, et Écologie Animale 17 (1-2): 3–9. (Acanthodactylus taghitensis, new species). (in French).
Padial JM (2006). "Commented distributional list of the reptiles of Mauritania (West Africa)". Graellsia 62 (2): 159–178.
Sindaco, Roberto; Jeremčenko, Valery K. (2008). The Reptiles of the Western Palearctic: 1. Annotated Checklist and Distributional Atlas of the Turtles, Crocodiles, Amphisbaenians and Lizards of Europe, North Africa, Middle East and Central Asia. (Monographs of the Societas Herpetologica Italica). Latina, Italy: Edizioni Belvedere. 580 pp. .
Trape, Jean-François; Trape, Sébastien; Chirio, Laurent (2012). Lézards, crocodiles et tortues d'Afrique occidentale et du Sahara. Paris: IRD Orstom. 503 pp. . (in French).

Acanthodactylus
Lacertid lizards of Africa
Reptiles of North Africa
Reptiles described in 1995